Durham MCC University (previously known as Durham University Centre of Cricketing Excellence) is a cricket coaching centre based at Durham University in Durham, County Durham, England, and the name under which the university's cricket team plays.

History
The coaching centre is largely funded by the Marylebone Cricket Club (MCC). As of 2012 (with the inclusion of Cardiff South Wales and Leeds/Bradford), they are one of six MCC University teams in England who are considered a first-class team when playing against other first-class sides. This means that a game against another university would not be considered first class; only matches against a first-class county are accorded this status. Durham are one of only two MCCU sides to be drawn from a single university (the other being Loughborough).

The cricket coaching at the MCCU was overseen from its inception in 2001 by coach and former Test player Graeme Fowler, the university's head coach from 1996, until he stepped down in May 2015. Former Essex coach Paul Grayson was announced as the new coach in September 2015. The team's home ground is The Racecourse, Durham University's home ground since 1843 and famous for hosting Durham County Cricket Club's first first-class match in 1992.

Since obtaining first-class status in 2001, the university has produced a large number of cricketers who have obtained professional county contracts, while others such as James Foster have gone on to play international cricket. Prior to first-class status, players such as Andrew Strauss and Nasser Hussain played for the university's cricket club.

In 2012, they were dismissed for 18 against Durham County Cricket Club. This was the lowest first-class innings total since 1983.

As Durham University Centre of Cricketing Excellence, the team played 27 first-class matches from 2001 to 2009. As Durham Marylebone Cricket Club University, the team played 21 first-class matches (not including one abandoned and two cancelled) from 2010 to 2020.

Honours

 MCC Universities Two-Day Championship winners 2010
 MCC Universities Challenge Final winners 2010 and 2018
 BUCS Cricket National Division winners 2018

See also
List of Durham UCCE & MCCU players

References

External links
 Team Durham: Cricket
 MCC Universities information & history – lords.org

Education in County Durham
Sports venues in County Durham
Durham University
2001 establishments in England
Cricket in County Durham
Sport in Durham, England
Sport at Durham University
Marylebone Cricket Club
Student cricket in the United Kingdom
County Durham-related lists
Former senior cricket clubs